The 1999 Women's African Volleyball Championship was held in Lagos, Nigeria, in 1999.

Group stage

Group A

|}

Standing

External links
 Results

2003 Women
African championship, women
Women's African Volleyball Championship
International volleyball competitions hosted by Nigeria
1999 in Nigerian sport